Sphalma is a genus of dead log beetles in the family Pythidae. There is one described species in Sphalma, S. quadricollis.

References

Further reading

 
 
 

Tenebrionoidea
Articles created by Qbugbot